Night People or The Night People may refer to:

People
 Night owl (person), a person who naturally stays up late at night

Arts and entertainment

Fictional entities
 Night People (comics), a team in the Marvel universe whose members include Demolition Man
 Night People, supernatural individuals in L.J. Smith's novel series Night World

Films 
 Night People (1954 film), a drama starring Gregory Peck
 Night People (2005 film), featuring Katrina Bryan
 Night People (2015 film), directed by Gerard Lough

Literature
 The Night People (1977), a novel by Jack Finney
 The Night People (novel), a 1947 novel by Francis Flagg
 Night People (1992), a book by Barry Gifford
 The Night People (2005), a short-story collection by Michael Reaves

Music

Groups and labels
 Night People, a record label whose roster included Redrum (band)
 The Night People, an American group featuring Darrel Grant, Blanche Carter, and Earl Young (drummer), known for their one hit wonder Again (1980)
 The Night People, an American band featured on the compilation album Highs in the Mid-Sixties, Volume 14 (1985)
 Night People is a live music venue in Manchester, UK - named after the John Cooper Clarke Song.

Albums
(Alphabetical by artist/group)
 Night People (Classix Nouveaux album), a 1981 album by Classix Nouveaux
 Night People (1978), an album by Lee Dorsey 
 Night People (2011), an album by Early Day Miners 
 Night People (1956), an album by Mort Herbert 
 Night People (1987), an album by soul singer John White for Geffen Records
 Night People (You Me at Six album) (2017), an album by You Me at Six

Songs
 "Night People" (The Human League song), a 2010 song by The Human League
 "Night People" (1976), a song by Baker Gurvitz Army 
 "Night People" (1963), a song by Bruce Channel 
 "Night People" (1982), a song by John Cooper Clarke 
 "Night People" (1981), a song by Classix Nouveaux 
 "Night People" (1987), a song by Dio from Dream Evil
 "Night People" (1981), a song by Kool and the Gang 

 "Night People" (1979), a song by Melba Moore 
 "Night People" (1970), a song by Ray Stevens 
 "Night People" (1980), a song by The Agents 
 "Night People" (1980), a song by The Tubes from Love Bomb
 "Night People" (1978), a song by Allen Toussaint, first released by Lee Dorsey
 "Night People" (1987), a song by soul singer John White for Geffen Records
 "Night People", a song by Tommy Wolf and Fran Landesman
 "Night People" (2017), a song by You Me at Six

Radio
 Night People (radio show), an American late-night talk show discussing the paranormal